Margarinotus merdarius is a species of clown beetle in the family Histeridae. It is found in Africa, Europe and Northern Asia (excluding China), and North America.

References

Further reading

 
 

Histeridae
Articles created by Qbugbot
Beetles described in 1803